Rosacea may refer to:
 Rosacea, a human skin condition
 Rosacea (hydrozoan), a genus of marine invertebrates in the family Prayidae
 Quercus × rosacea, a tree hybrid between Quercus petraea and Quercus robur

Not to be confused with:
 Rosaceae, a family of plants